Maneej Premnath was a film director concentrating on Bollywood films.

Career

Premnath started his career as an assistant director and worked for many TV series like Ssshhhh...Koi Hai. His short film  Who Am I ? was India's official entry in the 2008 Kara Film Festival. Later he worked as associate of Ram Gopal Varma and became independent director with the Hindi film,  The Waiting Room starring Radhika Apte.

Filmography
The Waiting Room (2010)
Ssshhhh...Koi Hai (television series) (as assistant director)
Who Am I ? (2008) (short film)

Death

Unfortunately, Premnath succumbed to brain stroke and the news was a shocker for the industry insiders as he has already signed contract to direct a Malayalam film scheduled to start in December 2012.

References

External links

1975 births
2012 deaths
People from Thalassery
Malayalam film directors
Indian television directors